The House of Miskito, also called the Miskitu or the Miskut, was a noble family from the Miskito coast and who came to reign over part of the current territories of the Atlantic Caribbean coast of Honduras and Nicaragua between 1687 and 1894, under the kingdom of the Mosquitia. Which happened to become a protectorate of the British Empire by 1687, and was one of the last existing ruling monarchies in America.

History

Origins 

The current territories of Gracias a Dios (Honduras) and the Autonomous Regions of the North and South Atlantic (Nicaragua) have been inhabited by ancestors of the Miskito ethnic group since times prior to the conquest of America, however the current territory of the Miskito coast was little explored by the Spanish conquerors with few attempts of it due to ists climate an deep jungles. The first conquest attempt was made by Hernán Cortes in 1525 after his landing in Honduras, after hearing rumors of the existence of human settlements and a large city, which experts say was what is today the archaeological site of Kaha Kamasa or white city.

However, the efforts were in vain and the region remained almost free of Spanish presence. The Miskito tribes were guided through a political system of chiefdoms, however by the end of the 16th century a fusion of all the small chiefdoms was achieved and the kingdom of the mosquita was established, its first King being a monarch with an unknown name but if you have data that they referred to him as "The Leader" or "The King" or "Ta Uplika", as it is said in Miskito language.

It was this man who had the first contacts with the English sailors and in this way they decided to establish commercial relations with them. The closeness with the English was so great that he decided to send his son, the future King Oldman to be sent to England where he was received in audience by King Charles I. He was taken to England and was received in audience by Charles II "shortly after the conquest of Jamaica" (1655) in London, where, apart from giving him a crown, he was named Olman I of the Miskito coast, and as they say in his native language "Taura a Uplica" or heir to the king also called "Wihta Tara". In the return to America from his kingdom until 1687 during his mandate there were conversions to Anglicanism, although this had already begun some time before assuming the throne when English missionaries came to America, this faith soon became the state religion. After his death his successor was his son Jeremy I who was also educated in England.

The kingdom and the royal house remained relatively safe keeping his reign in peace, continuing their lineage without big problems until the 19th century when it started a series of changes starting from the independence of Central America from the Spanish crown an the first Mexican empire, which claimed the Miskito coast as part of its territory, and as this even appeared on the official maps of the Central American federation. However, with the disintegration of the federation from 1839 on August 12, 1841, the superintendent of Belize and the Miskito monarch landed in San Juan del Norte and informed the Nicaraguan authorities that this city and the rest of the Atlantic Coast belonged to the Miskito kingdom.

Decadence 

The Nicaraguan Independent state recalmed the territories of the kingdom as part of thieirs, so in 1844 the United Kingdom and Nicaragua stablished that the new borders of the kingdom would be from, El Cabo, Honduras to Rio san Juan, Nicaragua, something that the Miksito Royalty didn't recognize, due to reduction of his territory and gived Honduras many of its land that they reclaimed as theirs.

Finally, in 1868 Honduras totally reincorporate his part of the Miskito coast to its territory creating the department of Gracias a Dios in 1868, This would result in the kingdom totally losing its legal claims to Honduran territory. For the following years the royal house would have a series of problems.

Disappearance 
The Miskito kingdom would remain standing until it disappeared completely in 1894, the year in which the government of José Santos Zelaya reestablished the domain and sovereignty of Nicaragua through the so-called Reincorporation of the Mosquitia, despite an attempt to reestablish it by the British in July of that same year, but recovered by Nicaragua in August. The last Miskito monarch was King Robert Henry Clarence also known as Robert II, who died in 1908.

List of monarchs 

 Ta Uplika (1620-1650)
 Old Man I (1650-1687)
 Jeremy I (1687-1718)
 Jeremy II (1718-1729) 
 Peter I (1729-1739)
 Edward I (1739-1755)
 George I (1755-1776)
 George II (1776-1801)
 George Frederic Augustus I (1801-1824)
 Robert Charles Frederic (1824-1842)
 George Augustus Frederic II (1842-1865)
 William Henry Clarence (1865-1879)
 George William Albert Hendy (1879-1888)
 Andrew Hendy I (1888-1889)
 Jonathan Charles Frederick I (1889-1890)
 Robert Henry Clarence II (1890-1894)

Descendants 
Some members of the Miskito Royal family fled Nicaragua after the abolition of the monarchy in 1894, most of them seek refugee in Jamaica and other places of the British Comomwealth, the most known case of a pretender to the crown willing to reinstate the monarchy was Robert Frederick I, heir to the kingdom of Mosquitia, he died in 1928, at Aubrayeri, Wanks River, Honduras. With the death of Robert Feredcerick it is said that the royal house was dissolved, however some descendants still live today, some claiming to be the representatives of the Miskito royal house.

Another descendant is the princess Mary Clarence, daughter of king Robert Clarence II, and his Brother Prince Robert Clarence IV. Other case of a pretender to the miskito throne was Norton Cuthbert Clarence, who in 1978 claimed to be the last hier to the throne. Other members of the Royal house are Velazco Hendy Oracio, Sean Henry Clarence, and José Miguel Coleman Hendy Clarence.

See also 

 History of Nicaragua
 History of Honduras

References 

History of Nicaragua
History of Honduras